Steve Lyons is a former professional rugby league footballer who played in the 1970s and 1980s.

Playing career
Steve Lyons made his début for Wakefield Trinity during September 1971, and he played his last match in his second spell for Wakefield Trinity during the 1981–82 season.

County honours
Steve Lyons won cap(s) for Yorkshire while at Wakefield Trinity.

Player's No.6 Trophy Final appearances
Steve Lyons played  in Wakefield Trinity's 11–22 defeat by Halifax in the 1971–72 Player's No.6 Trophy Final during the 1971–72 season at Odsal Stadium, Bradford, on Saturday 22 January 1972.

References

Living people
English rugby league players
Huddersfield Giants players
Hull Kingston Rovers players
Place of birth missing (living people)
Rugby league players from Yorkshire
Rugby league props
Wakefield Trinity players
Year of birth missing (living people)
Yorkshire rugby league team players